In the United States, certified anesthesiologist assistants (CAAs) are clinicians that practice medicine under the direction of licensed anesthesiologists to implement anesthesia care plans for a patient undergoing surgery. CAAs are integral members of the anesthesia care team as described by the American Society of Anesthesiologists (ASA). All CAAs possess a baccalaureate degree, and complete an intensive didactic and clinical program at a postgraduate level. CAAs are trained in the delivery and maintenance of all types of anesthesia care as well as advanced patient monitoring techniques. The goal of CAA education is to guide the transformation of student applicants into competent clinicians.

General description
Prior to acceptance into their respective graduate programs all anesthesiologist assistant students must possess an undergraduate degree.  The anesthesiologist assistant works under the medical direction of a physician anesthesiologist as a part of the  anesthesia care team. Anesthesiologist assistants administer all forms of anesthetic medications, IV fluids and blood products.

Anesthesiologist assistants generally work in the hospital setting but can work at any location such as pain clinics, dental offices, and outpatient surgical centers. Anesthesiologist assistants work in all facets of surgical environments such as endoscopy, conscious sedation, abdominal surgery, orthopedic surgery, as well as  cardiac surgery, neurosurgery, transplant surgery, and trauma surgery centers. Currently Certified Anesthesiologist Assistants are able to practice in sixteen states and Washington DC. In each of these states, the anesthesiologist assistant falls under the regulatory authority and licensing of the State Board of Medicine.

 there are twelve anesthesiologist assistant training programs in the United States all of which offer degrees at the Master's level. Approximately 97% of currently working anesthesiologist assistants hold a master's degree (some early anesthesiologist assistant graduates held bachelor's degrees). All newly credentialed and future anesthesiologist assistants must complete an accredited Master's program for anesthesiologist assistants. Upon completion of the educational program, graduates must sit for a credentialing exam that is co-validated by the National Board of Medical Examiners and National Commission for Certification of Anesthesiologist Assistants. All anesthesiologist assistant programs are credentialed by the Commission on Accreditation of Allied Health Educational Programs (CAAHEP).

History of the profession
In the 1960s, three anesthesiologists, Joachim S. Gravenstein, John E. Steinhaus, and Perry P. Volpitto, were concerned with the shortage of anesthesiologists in the country. These academic department chairs analyzed the spectrum of tasks required during anesthesia care. The tasks were individually evaluated based on the level of professional responsibility, required education and necessary technical skill. The result of this anesthesia workforce analysis was to introduce the concept of team care and to define a new type of anesthesia provider called a mid-level anesthesia practitioner linked to a supervising anesthesiologist. This new professional - the Anesthesiologist Assistant or AA - was an answer to help alleviate this shortage

The chairmen's vision became reality in 1969 when the first AA training programs began accepting students at Emory University in Atlanta, Georgia, and at Case Western Reserve University in Cleveland, Ohio.

Education
A master's level education is required to train anesthesiologist assistants to collect patient data, assist in the evaluation of patients’ physical and mental status, document the surgical procedures planned, and administer the therapeutic plan for patient care that has been formulated by the anesthesiologist. There are fifteen programs available for the Anesthesiologist Assistant master's degree in the United States. All programs are accredited by the Commission on Accreditation of Allied Health Education (CAAHEP).
 Case Western Reserve University in Cleveland, Ohio (Est. 1970)
 Case Western Reserve University in Houston, Texas (Est. 2010)
 Case Western Reserve University in Washington, District of Columbia (Est. 2012)
 Emory University in Atlanta, Georgia (Est. 1969)
 Indiana University School of Medicine in Indianapolis, Indiana (Est. 2017)
 Medical College of Wisconsin in Milwaukee, Wisconsin (Est. 2016)
 Northeast Ohio Medical University in Rootstown, Ohio (Est. 2022)
 Nova Southeastern University in Fort Lauderdale, Florida (Est. 2005)
 Nova Southeastern University in Tampa, Florida (Est. 2009)
 Nova Southeastern University in Jacksonville, Florida (Est. 2019)
 Ohio Dominican University in Columbus, Ohio (Est. 2022)
 South University in Savannah, Georgia (Est. 2004)
 South University in West Palm Beach, Florida (Est. 2021)
 University of Colorado in Denver, Colorado (Est. 2013)
 University of Missouri–Kansas City in Kansas City, Missouri (Est. 2008)

To enroll in an AA program, candidates require a bachelor's degree, specific courses with a focus in pre medical sciences and have to obtain a minimum of eight hours of documented anesthesia exposure by observation in the operating room.  All programs require an entrance exam (either GRE or MCAT, MCAT preferred).

Program lengths range from 24 to 28 months with didactic and clinical instruction. Didactic training includes courses such as physiology, pharmacology, airway management, simulation laboratory, Basic Life Support (BLS) certification, Pediatric Advanced Life Support (PALS) certification, Advanced Cardiac Life Support (ACLS) certification, anatomy, monitoring, and applied principles and practices. In addition to class work, programs include 2000 to 2700 clinical hours per student. Students gain preoperative, intra-operative and post-operative experience with a variety of patients in a variety of surgical settings. In addition, each program may have additional educational experiences; for example, Nova Southeastern University provides students with courses on scientific research and publishing. All programs must have at least one board-certified, licensed anesthesiologist serving as a director. Additionally, each AA program must be based at, or in collaboration with, a university that has a medical school.

Certification
Graduates from an accredited educational program are eligible to take the initial certifying examination and can do so up to 6 months before graduating from the program. The certifying examination for anesthesiologist assistants is a written exam administered by the National Board of Medical Examiners (NBME), which is contracted by the National Commission for Certification of Anesthesiologist Assistants (NCCAA). Once successfully completed, the NCCAA will award a time-limited certificate to each candidate. In order to maintain certification, anesthesiologist assistants need to register for 40 hours of Continuing Medical Education (CME) every two years and successfully complete a Continued Demonstration of Qualifications (CDQ) examination every six years.

Scope of practice
Anesthesiologist assistants are highly trained anesthetists who work under the direction of licensed physician anesthesiologists as integral members of the Anesthesia Care Team (ACT) . The following list is obtained from the American Academy of Anesthesiologist Assistants (AAAA), which states anesthesiologist assistant responsibilities may include but are not limited to:
 Obtain an appropriate and accurate pre-anesthetic health history; perform an appropriate physical examination and record pertinent data in an organized and legible manner.
Conduct diagnostic laboratory and related studies as appropriate, such as drawing arterial and venous blood samples.
Establish non-invasive and invasive routine monitoring modalities.
Administer induction agents, maintain and alter anesthesia levels, perform all types of intubations, administer adjunctive treatment and provide continuity of anesthetic care into and during the post-operative recovery period.
Apply and interpret advanced monitoring techniques, such as pulmonary artery catheterization, electroencephalographic spectral analysis, echocardiography, and evoked potentials.
Use advanced life support techniques, such as high frequency ventilation and intra-arterial cardiovascular assist devices.
Make post-anesthesia patient rounds by recording patient progress notes, compiling and recording case summaries, and by transcribing standing and specific orders.
Evaluate and treat life-threatening situations, such as cardiopulmonary resuscitation, on the basis of established protocols (BLS, ACLS, and PALS).
Perform duties in intensive care units, pain clinics, and other settings, as appropriate.
Train and supervise personnel in the calibration, troubleshooting, and use of patient monitors.
Delegate administrative duties in an anesthesiology practice or anesthesiology department in such functions as the management of personnel, supplies and devices.
Participate in the clinical instruction of others.
Perform and monitor regional anesthesia to include, but not limited to, spinal, epidural, IV regional, and other special techniques such as local infiltration and nerve blocks.

When employed in an anesthesia care team that includes CRNA’s, the CAA has an identical scope of practice and salary as all other anesthetists. The AA scope of practice may differ slightly in relation to local practice, and is usually defined by the medically directing anesthesiologist, the hospital's clinical protocol procedures, the state's board of medicine, and state regulations.

Employment
The American Medical Association (AMA) states that "AAs are most commonly employed in larger facilities that perform procedures such as cardiac surgery, neurosurgery, transplant surgery, and trauma care."
Studies by the AMA found entry-level salaries for 2006 Anesthesiologist Assistant graduates to be between $120,000 and $150,000 for the 40-hour work week plus benefits and consideration of on-call activity. They also found the high end of the salary range to be around $190,000 to $220,000 for experienced anesthesiologist assistants. Salaries vary by region and individual employer.

Anesthesiologist assistants are currently able to work in nineteen states plus Washington, D.C. and the US territory of Guam either by licensure or through physician delegation. AAs are recognized by the federal government and are authorized to work at all Veteran Affairs hospitals using the TRICARE insurance program.

Licensure defines the practice of AAs and is achieved through state law or by approval of the individual state board of medicine. Physician delegation is achieved through recognition of AAs by the state board of medicine or through statutes included in the state's medical practice act. The board of medicine affords Anesthesiologist's the right to delegate the responsibilities of their realm of practice to qualified individuals. Delegating authority requires that the physician remain ultimately responsible for the patient. In all states, the practice of anesthesiologist assistants is guided by the board of medicine. Any attempt to employ AAs under delegating authority should be made through the individual state's board of medicine.

States and territories where AAs practice through license and certification:
  Alabama
  Colorado
  District of Columbia
  Florida
  Georgia
  Guam
  Indiana
  Kentucky
  Missouri
  New Mexico
  North Carolina
  Ohio
  Oklahoma
  South Carolina
  Vermont
  Utah
  Wisconsin

States where AAs practice through physician delegation:
  Kansas
  Pennsylvania
  Michigan
  Texas

In the U.S. federal government
Anesthesiologist Assistants are employed at Veteran Affairs (VA) and Department of Defense facilities under the TRICARE health system since Dec 22, 2006.

The Veterans Health Administration Handbook 1123 on Anesthesia Service, includes the profession of anesthesiologist assistant as an allied health professional. Information in regards to required qualifications, coverage criteria, billing, and payment for Medicare services under the TRICARE program for anesthesiologist assistants is published by the Department of Health and Human Services.

AA's are currently classified as GS-0601, General Health Science Series employees, as defined by The Handbook of Occupational Groups and Families from the U.S. Office of Personnel Management.

See also
 Anesthesia
 Anesthesia provision in the US, a brief description of the different anesthesia providers in the US.
 Physicians' assistant (anaesthesia)

References

External links
 American Academy of Anesthesiologist Assistants (AAAA)
 National Commission for Certification of Anesthesiologist Assistants (NCCAA)
 Commission on Accreditation of Allied Health Education Programs (ARC-AA)
 Anesthesiologist Assistants: Qualified Members of the Anesthesia Care Team
 Comparison of AAs and CRNAs
 Federal Government: Anesthesiologist Assistants
 VAs and AAs

Anesthesia